Spiris slovenica is a moth in the family Erebidae. It was described by Franz Daniel in 1939. It is found in Slovenia, Italy and Austria.

Taxonomy
The species was described as a subspecies of Spiris striata, but raised to species status in 2012.

References

Moths described in 1939
Callimorphina